Doctor is a 1963] Indian Malayalam-language film, directed by M. S. Mani and produced by H. H. Ebrahim. The film stars Sathyan, Sheela, Thikkurissy Sukumaran Nair and T. S. Muthaiah. The film had musical score by G. Devarajan. The film received a certificate of merit at the National Film Awards.

Cast
 
Sathyan as Rajendran
Sheela as Jayasree
Thikkurissy Sukumaran Nair as Madhava menon
T. S. Muthaiah as Alex
Adoor Pankajam 
J. A. R. Anand 
Kottayam Chellappan 
Nellikode Bhaskaran 
O Madhavan 
S. P. Pillai 
K. V. Shanthi as Seetha
 Susheel
 Shyam
 Usha
 Shantha

Soundtrack
The music was composed by G. Devarajan and the lyrics were written by P. Bhaskaran.

References

External links
 

1963 films
1960s Malayalam-language films